Hugo Lafayette "Hugh" Black III (July 15, 1953 – September 29, 2007) was an American lawyer.

Life and career
Black was born in Birmingham, Alabama, the son of Hugo Black Jr. and Bessie Graham Hobson, and the grandson of Supreme Court Associate Justice Hugo Black.

Black graduated as valedictorian from Palmetto High School in Pinecrest, Florida in 1971. He attended Yale University, where he was his class president, and then graduated from Stanford Law School, where he was on the Stanford Law Review. Black served as a law clerk to Patrick Higginbotham of the United States Court of Appeals for the Fifth Circuit. Black was elected to the Florida House of Representatives in 1976 as a Democrat when he was 23 years old. He succeeded Bill Flynn. Black only served one term (1976–1978). He was then succeeded by Lawrence R. Hawkins.

Black worked at the law firm of Rosenfeld, Meyer & Susman as a partner from 1984 until he joined the entertainment division of Weissmann, Wolff, Bergman, Coleman & Silverman of Los Angeles in 1993. As an entertainment lawyer he represented screenwriters and actors, including Alex Hyde-White.

He returned to Miami to work at the United States Attorney's Office for the Southern District of Florida. He served as Assistant United States Attorney from 1995 until his death. As Assistant U.S. Attorney he mainly prosecuted white-collar fraud cases.

Black married Jeannine Crowell on October 16, 1996 in Pinecrest, Florida. They had no children.

Black died unexpectedly at his home in Coconut Grove Florida on September 29, 2007, at the age of 54 from gastrointestinal bleeding.

References

"AUSA Hugo Black III died this weekend." Southern District of Florida Blog 30 Sept. 2007. 
Brecher, Elinor J. "Hugo Black III, 54, assistant U.S. attorney, dies at 54." Miami Herald 4 Oct. 2007. 
Eller, Claudia. "Hugo Black III partners in Weissmann, Wolff." Variety 2 Apr. 1993. 
Weaver, Jay. "Hugo L. Black III: Miami prosecutor, judge's grandson." Miami Herald 1 Oct. 2007. 

1953 births
2007 deaths
Lawyers from Birmingham, Alabama
Politicians from Birmingham, Alabama
Democratic Party members of the Florida House of Representatives
Lawyers from Miami
Stanford Law School alumni
20th-century American politicians
People from Pinecrest, Florida
20th-century American lawyers
Yale College alumni